Vacation Club is an EP by Aerosmith, released on December 10, 1988. This E.P. was only sold in record stores in Japan. Vacation Club contains remixes of songs from Aerosmith's latest album and a previously unreleased song from the sessions entitled, "Once Is Enough". The album art uses the same cover as the Rag Doll single from 1987.

Track listing
 "Dude (Looks Like a Lady)" (Extended Rockin' Dude Mix) – 5:46
 "Dude (Dude This Way)" – 4:13
 "Rag Doll" (Extended Vacation Mix) – 7:14
 "Once Is Enough" (Finished Studio Version) – 5:20
 "Angel" (New AOR Mix) – 5:07

Personnel
Steven Tyler - lead vocals, piano
Tom Hamilton - bass
Joey Kramer - drums
Joe Perry - lead guitar, backing vocals, pedal steel guitar
Brad Whitford - rhythm guitar

Production
Bruce Fairbairn - Producer 
John Kalodner - Production

Release history

References

1988 EPs
Aerosmith EPs
Geffen Records EPs
Albums produced by Bruce Fairbairn

hu:Vaqcation Club (EP)